Never on the First Night is a 2014 French comedy film, directed by Melissa Drigeard.

Cast
 Alexandra Lamy as Julie
 Mélanie Doutey as Louise
 Julie Ferrier as Rose
 Jean-Paul Rouve as Marc
 Grégory Fitoussi as Ange
 Julien Boisselier as Charles
 Arnaud Henriet as Gilles
 Michel Vuillermoz as Viktor Bells
 Olivia Côte as TV Host

References

External links
 

2014 films
2014 comedy films
French comedy films
2010s French-language films
2010s French films